The canton of Bondy is an administrative division of the Seine-Saint-Denis department, Île-de-France region, northern France. It was created at the French canton reorganisation which came into effect in March 2015. Its seat is in Bondy.

It consists of the following communes:
Bobigny (partly)
Bondy
Les Pavillons-sous-Bois

References

Cantons of Seine-Saint-Denis